Walter "Casey" Bahr (born September 20, 1948) is a U.S. soccer defender who played one season in the North American Soccer League and one in the Major Indoor Soccer League.  He was a member of the U.S. soccer team at the 1972 Summer Olympics. He now coaches at Sussex Academy High School.

College
Bahr, the son of National Soccer Hall of Fame member Walter Bahr, attended the United States Naval Academy, playing soccer for the midshipmen.  He was a 1968 and 1969 honorable mention (third team) All America.  He graduated from Annapolis in 1970 and served three years in the U.S. Navy.

Professional
In 1973, Al Miller, head coach of the expansion Philadelphia Atoms of the North American Soccer League signed Bahr.  According to some sources, Bahr played only three games others say seventeen.  In 1978, he signed with the expansion Philadelphia Fever of the Major Indoor Soccer League (MISL).  He played nine games with the Fever.

Olympic team
A resident of Toms River, New Jersey serving with the Navy's Helicopter Antisubmarine Squadron, Bahr was part of the U.S. team that defeated the Jamaica national team to make it to the Olympics for the first time since the 1956 games. Bahr played three games for the 1972 U.S. Olympic soccer team in Munich.

References

External links
 Career Statistics

1948 births
Living people
American soccer players
North American Soccer League (1968–1984) players
Philadelphia Atoms players
Major Indoor Soccer League (1978–1992) players
Philadelphia Fever (MISL) players
Olympic soccer players of the United States
Footballers at the 1972 Summer Olympics
People from Mount Holly, New Jersey
People from Toms River, New Jersey
Soccer players from New Jersey
Sportspeople from Burlington County, New Jersey
Association football defenders